Paradize is a 2002 album recorded by French band Indochine.

Paradize may also refer to:
"Paradize", a song from the albums Paradize and 3.6.3 by French band Indochine
"Paradize Bay", a song from Europe by Swedish band Europe
Paradize Hole, a fictional New York City club in the video game Actua Pool
"Rainin In Paradize", a song from the album La Radiolina by French musician Manu Chao
Tony Saunders & Paradize, a band featuring American musician Tony Saunders (bassist)

See also
Paradise (disambiguation)